Anaphe reticulata is a moth of the family Notodontidae. It was described by Francis Walker in 1855. It is found in Angola, Eritrea, Ivory Coast, Malawi, Mozambique and South Africa.

The caterpillars can be seen precessing in single file along the ground or up trees. Allegedly they will cause a rash if touched.

References

 

Notodontidae
Moths described in 1855
Moths of Africa